Peter Sirch (born 30 December 1961) is a German former footballer who played as a goalkeeper. He is now a goalkeeper coach with Bayern Munich's youth team.

References

External links

1961 births
Living people
German footballers
Association football goalkeepers
TSV 1860 Munich players
TSV 1860 Munich II players
FC Bayern Munich footballers
FC Bayern Munich II players
FC Red Bull Salzburg players
SpVgg Unterhaching players
FC Bayern Munich non-playing staff
2. Bundesliga players
People from Immenstadt
Sportspeople from Swabia (Bavaria)
Footballers from Bavaria